Modi, Modestos or Agiou Modestou is a rock in the Meteora rock formation complex of Thessaly, Greece.

Monastery of St. Modestus
The Monastery of St. Modestus (Agiou Modestou, Αγίου Μοδέστου) was built around the 12th century on Modesto (Modi) Rock. It was first mentioned in a 12th-century letter and was also mentioned in 1614. The monastery ruins can still be found on Modi Rock.

References

Rocks of Meteora
Former Christian monasteries in Greece